XHEPC-FM is a radio station on 89.9 FM in Zacatecas, Zacatecas. The station is known as Sonido Estrella.

History
XHEPC began as XEPC-AM 1240, which signed on February 15, 1977 and received its concession that November. It was owned by José Jesús Jaquez Acuña. XEPC would later move to 890 kHz.

The station migrated to FM in 2012. Ownership was transferred in 2015 to a company owned by nine members of the Jaquez Bermúdez family.

References

Radio stations in Zacatecas
Radio stations established in 1977